Otakar Nožíř (12 March 1917 in Ledeč nad Sázavou – 2 September 2006 in Olomouc) was a Czech football midfielder who played for Czechoslovakia in the 1938 FIFA World Cup. He also played for Slavia Praha.

References

External links
 Profile at the ČMFS website
 
 

1917 births
2006 deaths
People from Ledeč nad Sázavou
People from the Kingdom of Bohemia
Czech footballers
Czechoslovak footballers
Czechoslovakia international footballers
Association football midfielders
1938 FIFA World Cup players
SK Slavia Prague players
Sportspeople from the Vysočina Region